The Class 67 locomotives are a class of Bo-Bo diesel-electric locomotives that were built for the English Welsh & Scottish Railway (EWS) between 1999 and 2000 by Alstom at Meinfesa in Valencia, Spain with drive components (engine, generator and traction motors) from General Motors' Electro-Motive Division.

EMD's designation for this locomotive type is JT42HW-HS.

History

Design, testing and introduction 
EWS ordered thirty locomotives via leasing company Angel Trains in a £45 million contract split between Alstom and Electro Motive Diesel, for use as Class 47 replacements for hauling high-speed Royal Mail trains and passenger trains. The locomotives were obtained on a 15-year lease from Angel Trains. At the end of the fifteen-year contract, ownership of the locomotives was transferred to DB Cargo UK.

The bodyshell is a monocoque load-bearing Alstom design, the bogies are an "H" frame Alstom design, the engine, traction motors and control electronics are GM-EMD products, and the same as used in the Class 66. Unlike the Class 66, the traction motors are frame mounted rather than axle hung to reduce unsprung mass and the gear ratio is increased allowing higher speeds. The cab design has a central driving position.

The locomotives are able to provide Electric Train Supply for passenger train heating and air-conditioning, and are equipped for both buffers and chain couplers and buckeye couplers, the latter attached by a swing arm mount.

High-speed running tests were undertaken with 67002 starting at Alstom's facility at La Sagra (Toledo, Spain) and running on the standard gauge Madrid-Toledo high-speed rail line.

The first locomotive to be delivered was 67003, which arrived in October 1999. Initially plans were for a rapid acceptance into service, but problems with the locomotives being slightly out of loading gauge caused delays. Acceptance trials began in December, and all 30 units had been delivered to the UK by early 2000.

Operations

DB Cargo UK 
The class were initially used primarily on mail trains. In June 2003 EWS lost the Royal Mail mail train contract, with services diminishing to complete cessation in March 2004.

The locomotives have since been used by First ScotRail on the Caledonian Sleeper on non-electrified lines north of Edinburgh. In April 2015, GB Railfreight commenced a contract to haul the Caledonian Sleeper with 67004 repainted and renamed for use on the service. When GB Railfreight started to provide the trains and crews for the Serco franchise in 2015, it was planned to use rebuilt . The first of these came into service in February 2016 but the Class 67s continued to be used on some services for another couple of years.

Class 67s are also used as Thunderbird rescue locomotives, for failed trains on the East Coast Main Line, on some freight trains, and for use on chartered tourist trains. Two locomotives were assigned to, and received special liveries for use with the Royal Train from 2003, and a third had a commemorative jubilee livery applied for use with the Royal Train during the Diamond Jubilee of Elizabeth II in 2012.

Five locomotives were also dedicated to Wrexham & Shropshire's services until it ceased operating in January 2011.

Chiltern Railways began using ex-Wrexham & Shropshire Class 67 hauled passenger sets in December 2010, in September 2011 after improvements to the Chiltern Main Line infrastructure, Chiltern began running a  service from London to Birmingham branded Mainline using Class 67 powered sets. Chiltern Railways leased six Class 68s from December 2014, to replace Class 67s on its Chiltern Main Line services.
In March 2012, Arriva Trains Wales began the lease of three Class 67s from DB Schenker to replace its Class 57s on its Premier Service.

GBRf 
In mid-2022, GBRf took over the leases for 67023 and 67027, though issues with the locomotives  meant that GBRf did not take over their operation until November 2022 when 67023 was moved to Scotland to start work on the Caledonian Sleeper contract on the Edinburgh – Inverness legs of the Highland diagrams. 67027 moved to Arlington Works (Eastleigh) for a repaint into GBRf livery, with maintenance work also being completed. 67023 ran its first Caledonian Sleeper diagram in December 2022.

Former Operators

Colas Rail 
In January 2017, DB Cargo UK sold 67023 and 67027 to Colas Rail, which were repainted at Toton TMD for use on Network Rail infrastructure monitoring trains. In December 2018, these two Class 67s were included in a sale of 67 France and UK based locomotives to Beacon Rail Leasing. They were subsequently leased back to Colas Rail.

Fleet

Summary

Fleet List 
Locomotives that do not currently carry their names are shown with the name in brackets.

Liveries and namings 
The locomotives were initially painted in EWS's maroon and yellow livery. In 2003, 67005 and 67006 replaced the two previous Class 47 locomotives hauling the Royal Train. These were repainted in the Royal Claret colour and named Queen's Messenger and Royal Sovereign, respectively, in December 2000 and February 2005.

In October 2004, 67029 was repainted silver, with full bodyside height EWS logos, to haul the EWS Company Train. On 12 October 2007, 67029 was named Royal Diamond at Rugeley Trent Valley railway station, in honour of the 60th wedding anniversary of Queen Elizabeth II and Prince Philip.

In 2008, 67012–67015 were repainted in Wrexham & Shropshire's silver and grey livery. In 2008, these were named A Shropshire Lad (3 July), Dyfrbont Pontcysyllte (9 July), Thomas Telford (14 July) and David J Lloyd (16 May), respectively. These were joined by 67010 in March 2009, to add resilience to the sub-fleet. The sub-fleet was dispersed at the end of 2014, with locomotives receiving further repaints appropriate to their new roles.

In January 2010, 67018 was repainted into DB Schenker red with a maple leaf and named Keith Heller at the National Railway Museum. in honour of the Canadian-born former EWS and DB Schenker UK chairman.

In 2011, 67001–67003 were repainted into Arriva Trains Wales blue livery, although without any company decals, for use on the daily Cardiff-Holyhead service.

In March 2012, 67026 received a silver livery, union flag and Diamond Jubilee logo for use during the Diamond Jubilee of Elizabeth II celebrations, being named Diamond Jubilee by Queen Elizabeth II on 23 March at London Victoria station.

In March 2015, 67004 received the Caledonian 'Midnight Teal' livery and was named Cairn Gorm. This, along with similarly repainted 67010, was used on the non-electrified parts of the Serco Caledonian Sleeper until the release of sufficient Class 73/9s for use by GB Railfreight. Both 67004 and 67010 have since been repainted into DB Cargo red livery, and are now both operational (67004 being stored for nearly two years).

In June 2017 Colas Rail duo 67023 and 67027 received the names Stella and Charlotte, respectively, on nameplates carried centrally on the bodysides.

19/20 October 2017 saw 67021 and 67024 rolled out in (unbranded) Belmond British Pullman umber and cream livery, receiving Belmond British Pullman logos a few months later.

In October 2018 the Royal locomotives, 67005 and 67006 were repainted into a slightly revised version of the Royal claret livery.

Incidents 

A serious crash occurred with 67002 at Lawrence Hill (Bristol) on 1 November 2000, when a Royal Mail train passed two red signals and ran into the back of a coal train at around 3:30 am. The mail train, hauled by 67002 "Special Delivery" with 67012 at the rear, was travelling at  when the incident occurred. The locomotive climbed over the back of the coal train, coming to rest  later on top of a coal wagon and against the A420 Church Road bridge. The driver of the mail train suffered a broken arm and cuts to the face and chest, but there were no other injuries. The incident was initially suspected to be caused by faulty brakes but was later found to be caused by misunderstanding and incorrect use of the locomotive's brake pipe isolation valve by railway staff.

Model railways 
In 2006, Hornby Railways launched its first version of the BR Class 67 in OO gauge range in a variety of liveries. The class 67 is also one of the few British locomotives commercially available in T Scale.

See also 
The Israel Railways JT 42BW and Renfe Class 333.3 are a similar design
Vossloh Euro 4000 – Related locomotives built at the same factory (former Alstom Valencia plant)

References and sources

References

Sources 

, some minor inaccuracies in article

Further reading 

67
Electro-Motive Division locomotives
Alstom Prima diesel locomotives
Bo-Bo locomotives
Railway locomotives introduced in 1999
Macosa/Meinfesa/Vossloh Espana locomotives
Standard gauge locomotives of Great Britain
Diesel-electric locomotives of Great Britain